Rain Valdez (born 1981) is an American actress, writer, and producer who rose to prominence with her award-winning short film, Ryans. She stars in the web series Razor Tongue, which she created  and which has earned her a Primetime Emmy nomination in Outstanding Actress in a Short Form Comedy or Drama Series.

Valdez got her start playing Coco in season 2 of TV Land's Lopez. She consulted on Transparent and starred in the show's fourth season. She has written for Vice and Popsugar.

Early life

Valdez was born in Manila, Philippines and was raised by her mother and stepfather in Dededo, Guam. She began writing poems and short stories as a junior high school student. She attended Simon Sanchez High School in Yigo before moving to Los Angeles in 2000, waiting tables and modeling to support herself while studying acting.

Career
Valdez began her career as a producer's assistant in 2006. In 2010, she wrote and starred in her first short, Silly Games. In 2017, she wrote and starred in her breakthrough short film, Ryans, which premiered at Outfest and was given the Jury Award for Best North American Short. The same year, she was cast in TV Land's Lopez, with a recurring role. Also in 2017, Valdez was cast for Amazon's Transparent. In 2019, Valdez created Razor Tongue, an indie episodic romantic comedy, and co-starring such actors as Alexandra Grey, Sterling Jones, Sarah Parlow, Carmen Scott, and Shaan Dasani.

In 2020, Valdez appeared as a commentator in the Netflix documentary Disclosure alongside actors Laverne Cox, Jen Richards, Zeke Smith, Leo Sheng, Alexandra Billings, and others. In July 2020, she was nominated for a Primetime Emmy Award for Outstanding Actress in a Short Form Comedy or Drama Series for her work on Razor Tongue. In October 2020, she co-starred in the short film The Great Artist, which qualified for the Best Live Action Short Film shortlist for the 93rd Academy Awards.

Activism
Valdez has been a featured speaker at conferences such as The New School's The Festival of the New, and WrapWomen's BE Conference.

Personal life
Valdez is a trans woman. She initially began her career closeted, eventually deciding to live as an openly trans individual, with her stint on Transparent as her first role as an openly trans woman.

Podcasts

See also
 List of transgender film and television directors

References

External links

20th-century American actresses
21st-century American actresses
American women screenwriters
American television writers
People from Manila
American television actresses
Filipino LGBT actors
Guamanian LGBT people
LGBT film producers
Transgender actresses
Transgender women
Transgender rights activists
American LGBT rights activists
American LGBT actors
1981 births
Living people
American LGBT people of Asian descent